The Confluence Project is a series of outdoor installations and interpretive artworks located in public parks along the Columbia River and its tributaries in the U.S. states of Washington and Oregon. Each art installation explores the confluence of history, culture and ecology of the Columbia River system.  The project draws on the region's history, including Native American traditional stories and entries from the Lewis and Clark Expedition journals, to "evoke a landscape and a way of life submerged in time and memory." The project reaches from the mouth of the Columbia River to Hells Canyon.

Artist Maya Lin designed installations that followed the path of Lewis and Clark through the Columbia River Basin. Lin collaborated with landscape architects, such as Johnpaul Jones, to produce earthen works that helped restore natural environments.  Each artwork was based on traditions grounded in Native American cultures and drew text from Lewis and Clark's journals.

Confluence is a community supported nonprofit 501(C)(3) based in Vancouver, Washington, incorporated in 2002. The mission is to connect people to the history, living cultures, and ecology of the Columbia River system through Indigenous voices.

Sites
Washington
Cape Disappointment State Park, Ilwaco, Washington (Completed 2005, dedicated 2006) Map 
Ridgefield National Wildlife Refuge, Vancouver, Washington (in planning stages)
Vancouver Land Bridge at Fort Vancouver National Historic Site, Vancouver, Washington (completed 2008)
Sacajawea State Park, Pasco, Washington (Completed 2010)
Chief Timothy Park, Clarkston, Washington (Scheduled for completion in Spring 2015)

Oregon
Sandy River Delta Bird Blind (Completed 2008)
Celilo Falls (Scheduled for completion in 2016)

References

External links
Confluence Project

Outdoor sculptures in Washington (state)
Outdoor sculptures in Oregon
Columbia River Gorge